The Satellite Award for Best Actor in a Television Series – Musical or Comedy is one of the annual Satellite Awards given by the International Press Academy.

Winners and nominees

1990s

2000s

2010s

2020s

References

External links	
 Official website

Actor Television Series Musical or Comedy
Television awards for Best Actor